Elisabeth Gram (born 17 April 1996) is an Austrian freestyle skier. She competed in the 2018 Winter Olympics in the women's halfpipe.

References

 

1996 births
Living people
Freestyle skiers at the 2018 Winter Olympics
Austrian female freestyle skiers
Olympic freestyle skiers of Austria
Freestyle skiers at the 2012 Winter Youth Olympics
People from Landeck District
Sportspeople from Tyrol (state)
Youth Olympic gold medalists for Austria
21st-century Austrian women